Alexander Rüstow (8 April 1885 – 30 June 1963) was a German sociologist and economist. In 1938 he originated the term neoliberalism at the Colloque Walter Lippmann. He was one of the fathers of the "Social Market Economy" that shaped the economy of West Germany after World War II. He is the grandnephew of Wilhelm Rüstow, the grandson of Cäsar Rüstow and the father of Dankwart Rustow.

Life
Rüstow was born in Wiesbaden in the Prussian Province of Hesse-Nassau in to the family of a Prussian military officer. From 1903 till 1908, he studied mathematics, physics, philosophy, philology, law and economics, at the universities of Göttingen, Munich and Berlin. In 1908, he obtained his doctorate under Paul Hensel, at the University of Erlangen, on a mathematical topic, Russell's paradox. He then worked at the Teubner publishing house in Berlin, until 1911, when he started working on his habilitation, on the knowledge theory of Parmenides. He had to interrupt his work though at the outbreak of the First World War, when he volunteered for the German Army.

After the war, Rüstow, then still a socialist, participated in the November Revolution, and obtained a post at the Ministry of Economic Affairs, working on the nationalization process of the coal industry in the Ruhr Area. Disillusioned with socialist planning, he started working for the VdMA, the German Engineering Federation in 1924. The engineering companies in Germany suffered much by the protected and subsidized coal and mine industry.

In the 1930s, the climate in Germany became too unfriendly for Rüstow; he was blacklisted in 1933 and fled to Switzerland, where he was offered a chair in economic geography and history at the University of Istanbul, Turkey. In Istanbul, he worked on his magnum opus, Ortsbestimmung der Gegenwart (in English published as Freedom and Domination), a critique of civilization. In 1938 at the Colloque Walter Lippmann, it was Rüstow who created the term 'neoliberalism' to separate new liberalism from classical liberalism. Rüstow promoted the concept of the social market economy, and this concept promotes a strong role for the state with respect to the market, which is in many ways different from the ideas which are nowadays connected with the term neoliberalism.

In 1949, Rüstow returned to Germany and obtained a chair at the University of Heidelberg, where he remained until his retirement in 1956. He died in 1963 at age 78 in Heidelberg.

Ordoliberalism

Together with Walter Eucken and Franz Böhm, Rüstow provided the necessary foundational work of Ordoliberalism.

Work 
 Der Lügner. Theorie, Geschichte und Auflösung des Russellschen Paradoxons, 1910 (thesis)
 Schutzzoll oder Freihandel?, 1925
 Das Für und Wider der Schutzzollpolitik, 1925
 Das Versagen des Wirtschaftsliberalismus, 1945, Republished in 2001, 
 Zwischen Kapitalismus und Kommunismus, 1949
 Das Versagen des Wirtschaftsliberalismus, 2nd edition, 1950
 Ortsbestimmung der Gegenwart. Eine universalgeschichtliche Kulturkritik, ("Determination of the Present's Location"), 3 Volumes, 1950–1957
 Volume 1: Ursprung der Herrschaft ("Origin of Rule")
 Volume 2: Weg der Freiheit ("March of Freedom")
 Volume 3: Herrschaft oder Freiheit? ("Rule or Freedom")
 Wirtschaft und Kultursystem, 1955
 Die Kehrseite des Wirtschaftswunders, 1961

References

Further reading

External links
 

1885 births
1963 deaths
German economists
German sociologists
German Army personnel of World War I
People from Wiesbaden
People from Hesse-Nassau
German male non-fiction writers
Member of the Mont Pelerin Society